Ram Sajeevan (born 2 January 1929 Sonepur, Banda district, Uttar Pradesh, India) is an Indian politician of the Bahujan Samaj Party. He was a member of the Uttar Pradesh Legislative Assembly four times between 1969 and 1989 as a member of the Communist Party of India. He was elected 9th Lok Sabha from Banda as a Communist Party of India politician, but in 1996 he left the Communist Party of India and joined the Bahujan Samaj Party. He later was elected to the Banda constituency in the 1996 and 1999 Lok Sabha elections.

References 

Living people
1929 births
India MPs 1989–1991
India MPs 1996–1997
India MPs 1999–2004
People from Banda, Uttar Pradesh
Lok Sabha members from Uttar Pradesh
Communist Party of India politicians from Uttar Pradesh
Bahujan Samaj Party politicians from Uttar Pradesh
Uttar Pradesh MLAs 1967–1969
Uttar Pradesh MLAs 1977–1980
Uttar Pradesh MLAs 1969–1974
Uttar Pradesh MLAs 1974–1977
Uttar Pradesh MLAs 1985–1989